Clermont Transportation Connection (CTC) is a public transportation agency serving Clermont County, Ohio, United States. It operates two fixed transit bus routes, the Dial-A-Ride demand responsive transport service, and paratransit service. The two fixed routes are express routes from suburban areas to Downtown Cincinnati. Three Southwest Ohio Regional Transit Authority bus routes (28, 29X, 82X) also extend into the county with funding from CTC.

CTC was founded in 1977 as Clermont Area Rural Transit (CART).

Routes

Former routes:

 Route 1, the Felicity - Eastgate Shuttle, traveling once in each direction per day, provided a crucial link between rural Felicity and Franklin Township with both places of employment and shopping destinations in suburban Union Township. The route's final run was on September 26, 2019.
 Route 3 provided all-day local service between Milford, Goshen Township, and Miami Township, with connecting service to Downtown Cincinnati via SORTA Routes 28 and 28X.

See also
 Southwest Ohio Regional Transit Authority (SORTA), serving Cincinnati
 Warren County Transit, serving Warren County, Ohio

References

External links
 

Bus transportation in Cincinnati
Transportation in Clermont County, Ohio
1977 establishments in Ohio
Government agencies established in 1977